Route 316 is a state highway in east central Connecticut running from Hebron to Andover.

Route description
Route 316 begins at an intersection with Route 66 in Hebron and heads generally north into Andover.  In Andover, it continues generally north to end at an intersection with US 6 at the town center.

History
Route 316 was commissioned from SR 816 in 1963 and has had no significant changes since.

Junction list

References

External links

316
Transportation in Tolland County, Connecticut